Nadia Ben Azizi (born 9 July 2002) is a Tunisian fencer. She competed in the women's sabre event at the 2020 Summer Olympics in Tokyo, Japan. She also competed in the women's team sabre event.

References

External links 
 

Living people
2002 births
Place of birth missing (living people)
Tunisian female sabre fencers
Fencers at the 2020 Summer Olympics
Olympic fencers of Tunisia
21st-century Tunisian women